One Inch Man is a song by American rock band Kyuss. It is the first and only single from their fourth and final album ...And the Circus Leaves Town, released in 1995.

Release

In the US, "One Inch Man" received some airplay on Active rock radio in 1995.

Reception

Music & Media, in a review of the album, ...And the Circus Leaves Town, stated of the song Perhaps their abilities are best summarised in the first single "One Inch Man", which boasts a killer guitar riff and hook to match.

In a 2015 retrospective review of the album, The Quietus stated that "One Inch Man" still stands tall today as a track worthy of the now-lauded Kyuss name.

In a 2020 interview with Loudersound.com, Louise Lemón said of "One Inch Man": The repetitiveness is what gets me going with this track. When I write, I usually write just one or two sentences and I could be fine with that. I love everything that is repetitive, like a mantra, it soothes.

Music videoKerrang! said of the music video for "One Inch Man": Case in point: the clip for One Inch Man from ...Circus simply shows the band playing in the desert and in a room under psychedelic lights. No glitz, no glamour, but by God they were the band you wanted to have a beer with.''

Track listings

 Germany CD
"One Inch Man" – 3:29
"Flip The Phrase" – 2:16
"Mudfly" - 2:26
"A Day Early And A Dollar Extra" - 2:17

US promo CD, Spain promo CD
"One Inch Man" – 3:29

Germany promo cassette
"One Inch Man" – 3:29
"One Inch Man" – 3:29

Charts

References

Kyuss songs
1995 singles